School No. 27 (Commodore John Rodgers Elementary School) is a historic elementary school located in Baltimore, Maryland, United States. It was built and opened in 1913.  It is a freestanding brick building that rises –4 levels from a low granite base to its essentially flat roof and parapet.  The exterior features a double stair of granite that leads up to the main entrance at the first floor of the building.

School No. 27 (Commodore John Rodgers Elementary School) was listed on the National Register of Historic Places in 1986.

References

External links
, including photo from 1985, at Maryland Historical Trust

Butchers Hill, Baltimore
Defunct schools in Maryland
Public schools in Baltimore
School buildings on the National Register of Historic Places in Baltimore
School buildings completed in 1913
1913 establishments in Maryland